Player's Secrets of Talinie is an accessory for the 2nd edition of the Advanced Dungeons & Dragons fantasy role-playing game, published in 1995.

Contents
Talinie is a heavily wooded, mineral-rich land that has been extensively exploited in an effort to improve the economy. While this policy has worked, the price is high in terms of environmental degradation, and control of the mining and timber guilds has been passed covertly to foreign powers. Meanwhile, on the southern border the army of Boeruine also poses a threat, while Talinie's high priest pursues religious unity. Talinie's wizard has discovered how to maximize the magic potential of the land, which has been depleted by cultivation and mining.

Publication history
Player's Secrets of Talinie was published by TSR, Inc. in 1995.

Reception
Cliff Ramshaw reviewed Player's Secrets of Talinie for Arcane magazine, rating it a 6 out of 10 overall. He described Talinie as "a theocracy suitable for rule by a lawful priest or a paladin with a penchant for flowers, but not everything is sweetness and light". He commented that Boeruine "is ready to provide the same sort of support that Czechoslovakia and Afghanistan received from the USSR" and that the high priest "pursues religious unity with a vigour to make Spain's Grand Inquisitor blush". He also felt that there was "the thorny question of progress", where the wizard's plans involve ethics that are "ambiguous to say the least". Ramshaw concluded by saying: "This sourcebook should appeal to the 'set the world to rights' brigade. It's just as well that there's so much going on, though, because the domain itself, for all its crofts, flower gardens and glass blowing, won't hold your interest for long."

Reviews
Dragon #229

References

Birthright (campaign setting) supplements
Role-playing game supplements introduced in 1995